Hail Haor Wildlife Sanctuary is a major wildlife sanctuary  in Bangladesh. It is one of the most important wetlands in the Sylhet Basin for the resident and migratory waterfowls. It is also important watersource for the inhabitants living around when all other sources dry up during summer.  The sanctuary is located in Moulvibazar District, in the northeast region of the country.

Description
The sanctuary is located mainly between the hills on the south, west and east side and Manu and Kushiara river plains on the north. The hills are covered with tea gardens and natural forest blocks. The water of the wetland extends to cover approximately  during the monsoon and shrinks to  during the summer season. It is restricted to 130 beels and narrow canals. There are about 172000 people living in 62 villages around the wetland.
The receding water after monsoon exposes the land which is converted to rice fields by local people. The Bangladesh Government and the United States Agency for International Development implemented a project called 'Management of Aquatic ecosystems through Community Husbandry' from 1998 to 2008. This project involved local groups in wetland conservation, restoration and management.

Location

Climate

Administration
The Forest Department has set up a centre for protection of waterfowls from hunting and poaching.

Biodiversity
The flora and fauna are mainly associated with wetland adaptations.

Flora

Much of the lake area is overgrown with Indian lotus (Nelumbo nucifera) and water hyacinth (Pontederia crassipes). The majority of hydrphytes are Typha elephantina, Trapa bispinosa, Hygrorhiza aristata, and species of Utricularia, Ceratophyllum, Vallisneria, Hydrilla, Najas, Potamogeton, Nymphoides, Pistia, Lemna and Azolla. The trees and shrubs growing in adjacent area include Bambusa spp., Musa spp., Mangifera indica, Erythrina spp. and Crataeva nurvula.

Fauna
There are large variety of waterfowls found in the sanctuary. The waterfowls up to a population of 40,000 to 50,000 are seen during the winter. The water fowls manly observed are lesser whistling duck (Dendrocygna javanica), fulvous whistling duck (D. bicolor), cotton pygmy goose (Nettapus coromandelianus), garganey (Anas querquedula), northern pintail (A. acuta), northern shoveler (A. clypeata), common teal (A. crecca) common pochard, (Aythya nyroca), tufted duck (A. fuligula), gadwall (Anas strepera), spotbill duck (A. poecilorhyncha), bar-headed goose (Anser indicus), greylag goose (Anser anser), ruddy shelduck (Tadorna ferruginea), comb duck (Sarkidiornis melanotos), teal (Anas falcata), mallard (A. platyrhynchos), red-crested pochard (Netta rufina), common pochard (Aythya ferina), Baer's pochard (A. baeri), grebe (Tachybaptus ruficollis), little cormorant (Phalacrocorax niger), Indian pond heron (Ardeola grayii), cattle egret (Bubidcus ibis), little egret (Egretta garzetta), intermediate egret (E. intermedia), great egret (E. alba), water cock (Gallicrex cinerea), moorhen (Gallinula chloropus), purple swamphen (Porphyria porphyria), common coot (Fulica atra), pheasant-tailed jacana (Hydrophasianus chirurgus), bronze-winged jacana (Metopidius indicus), along with Herons, kingfisher, egrets and terns. Raptors include osprey (Pandion haliaetus), Eurasian marsh harrier (Circus aeruginosus) and pied harrier (C. melanoleucos). Threatened birds include Baer’s pochard, greater spotted eagle (Clanga clanga) and Pallas’s fish eagle (Haliaeetus leucoryphus).

Other wildlife occurring in the area include mainly amphibians, reptiles and turtles. The fishes include Catla catla, Labeo rohita, L. calbasu, L. gonius, Cirrhina mrigala, Barbus spp., Wallago attu, Mystus tengra, Mystus aor and Oampokpabda, Gadusia chapra, Clupea spp., Notoptenis notopterus, Clarius batrachus, Heteropneustes fossilis, Channa spp., Anabas testudineus and Colis afasciota. Freshwater shrimps of the genus Macrobrachium are common.

Threats
 Existing wetland continue to be under the threat of siltation, being drained for agriculture and industry. The water bodies are converted to small fishing blocks by artificial embankments and roads. This has resulted in decline of fish population along with the waterfowls. 
The loss of tree diversity and population is due to encroachments for cultivation, invasion of weed species, grazing of cattles, collection of minor forest produces and fuel wood, fire hazard, expansion of network of roads and other infrastructure projects. 
There are large population of people living along the wetland. They are mostly migrants and are involved in fishing and cultivation for their livelihood.

See also

 List of protected areas of Bangladesh

References

National parks of Bangladesh
Forests of Bangladesh
1983 establishments in Bangladesh
Protected areas established in 1983
Wildlife sanctuaries of Bangladesh
Lower Gangetic Plains moist deciduous forests
Moulvibazar District